Saira Peter MSc MA (Lon) is a British-Pakistani soprano officially recognised as the world's first Sufi Opera singer. She is Director of NJ Arts London, a multicultural performing arts centre opened in 1998 by Sir Cliff Richard OBE. She is also founder of Saira Arts Academy in Karachi.

Early life
Born in Karachi, Pakistan, Peter displayed singing talent at a young age, performing for church and community events, but she had no formal music training as a child. Upon completing her first Masters she moved to London and began to study western classical voice.

Education and Training 
Saira Peter completed both a BSc (Hons) and an MSc (Distinction) in Physical Chemistry from University of Karachi, followed by an MA in History from Queen Mary University of London.

She is coached in western classical voice by composer Paul Knight. She has studied raagdari with Chitrarupa Gupta (disciple of Pundit A.T. Kanan and Geeta Bannerjee) and Ustad Fida Hussain Khan (Patiala Gharana).

Performance 
Peter has given solo western classical performances in the UK, USA, Germany, Turkey and Pakistan.

Her 2016 Pakistan debut took place at Pearl-Continental Hotel in Karachi, followed since by performances at major national venues including Mohatta Palace, Aiwan-e-Sadr (Presidential Palace, Islamabad), Governor House in Karachi, Alhamra Art Center in Lahore, Pakistan National Council of Arts (Islamabad and Lahore). She is regularly invited by the High Commission of Pakistan, London to sing at official events, which they feature on official social media.

Peter was Final Judge and then Chief Judge on two consecutive seasons of Pakistan's reality series Voice of Sindh.

In September 2021 she performed a well-received solo set at the international Mystic Music Festival, Konya, Turkey in commemoration of the birth of sufi poet Maulana Rumi.

Television and Film 
Peter is increasingly in demand as an OST (original soundtrack) singer for primetime television dramas. On 6 May 2022 her OST featured on GEO TV's "Dil Awaiz", a duet with Nabeel Shaukat (Composer: Naveed Nashad), the first episode quickly gaining millions of views. She recorded a solo OST composed by Naveed Nashad for HUM TV network's "Nehar", the first episode airing 9 May 2022.

Sufi Opera 
Passionate about bringing together people of all backgrounds, during her second MA (History) Saira Peter identified music as a historical means of bridging otherwise isolated communities and promoting a positive message. Simultaneously in the midst of studying Western Classical voice, she envisioned using her music to take Sufi peace poetry to the world stage.

In 2015-16 she worked with vocal coach Paul Knight to create several Sufi Opera songs based on English translations of poetry by Shah Abdul Latif Bhittai. These were well received by diverse audiences in the UK, USA and Pakistan. She is currently working with a team of British artists to develop the world’s first full-scale “Sufi Opera”, a musical stage drama based on the story of Umar Marvi, one of Latif’s “seven heroines” of Sindh. It is set to be staged in London upon completion, and Peter will take the role of "Marvi".

Personal life 
Saira Peter lives in London, UK with her husband, the ethnomusicologist and pianist / harmonium player Stephen Smith.

Artistry
According to The Express Tribune, Peter's career wish is "to translate Sufi poetry for Western music so they can understand Pakistani people and their desire for peace." Her music has been described as a fusion of Western and Pakistani classical music, and she regularly incorporates both traditional Pakistani songs and Western classical art songs into her concerts. Pakistan's mainstream media often credits Saira Peter with introducing Western operatic singing to Pakistan.

Awards
 Islamabad Art Fest 2019: Award for 'Best Music Performance' at Pakistan's largest international arts event

Discography
Resplendent (2017)
Raqs-E-Rooh (2018)
Yeh Zindagi (2021)

Videography

 Zarori Tha - 2015
 Pairey Pawandi Saan - 2015
 Aao Rana - 2015
 You Are My Friend - 2015

References

Pakistani playback singers
Year of birth missing (living people)
Living people
20th-century Pakistani women singers
Alumni of Queen Mary University of London
Pakistani Christians
Pakistani emigrants to the United Kingdom